The Day Must Dawn is a 1942 historical novel by the American writer Agnes Sligh Turnbull (1888–1982) set in 1777 in Hanna's Town, Pennsylvania, a frontier settlement thirty miles east of Pittsburgh.

The novel is an 18th-century pioneer romance about a Scots-Irish family living in Pennsylvania. The mother, toughened by hardships, tries to have her daughter go east to a more civilized life. The novel peaks with the burning of Hanna's Town in July 1782 by British-allied American Indians led by Guyasuta. The story concludes with her acceptance that her daughter will marry a frontiersman and go west to even wilder country.

References

1942 American novels
American historical novels
Fiction set in 1777
Fiction set in 1782
Novels set in the 1770s
Novels set in the 1780s
Novels set in Pennsylvania
Novels set during the American Revolutionary War